Fiel a la Vega is the first album by the rock en español band Fiel a la Vega, released in 1996. The album is still considered one of the most influential albums in rock en español.

Track listing
All songs written by Tito Auger, except where noted.
 "Salimos de Aquí" – 6:32
 "Las Flores de Emilio" (Auger, Ricky Laureano) – 6:11
 "Mil Canciones" – 4:50
 "Nada" (Laureano) – 1:45
 "Los Superhéroes" – 6:49
 "De Pecho" – 4:00
 "Un Pueblo Durmiendo" – 6:31
 "'86" – 7:29
 "El Wanabí" – 5:08
 "De Mi Casa y Mi Viento" (Auger, Laureano) – 7:05
 "Una Plegaria Más" – 6:41

Track information
 "El Wanabi" was written for the short film Una Noche en Hollywood (One Night in Hollywood) by Edmundo Rodríguez. It was recorded and mixed on March 9, 1996, by Candido Parilla, and mastered at Digital Recording Service. (This is written in the album's liner notes)

Certification
On April 13, 1997, the album was certified gold for selling 50,000 units.

Personnel
 Tito Auger - lead vocals, rhythm guitar
 Ricky Laureano - lead guitar, vocals
 Jorge Arraiza - bass guitar
 Pedro Arraiza - drums

Additional musicians
 Hiram Williams - cello ("Una Plegaria Más")
 Elliud - percussion ("Las Flores de Emilio")
 Papo Román - percussion ("El Wanabi")

1996 debut albums
Fiel a la Vega albums